The 1986 Irish Masters was the twelfth edition of the professional invitational snooker tournament, which took place from 8 to 13 April 1986. The tournament was played at Goffs in Kill, County Kildare, and featured twelve professional players.

Jimmy White won the title for the second time, beating Willie Thorne 9–5 in the final.

Main draw

References

Irish Masters
Irish Masters
Irish Masters
Irish Masters